Willow River may refer to:

Canada 
 Willow River (British Columbia), tributary of the Fraser River originating in the Cariboo goldfields, Canada
 Willow River, British Columbia, a community, Canada

United States 
 Willow River, Minnesota, a community at the confluence of the Kettle and Willow Rivers, Pine County, U.S.
 Willow River (Kettle River tributary), in Pine County, Minnesota, U.S.
 Willow River (Little Fork River tributary), in Minnesota, U.S.
 Willow River (Mississippi River tributary), in Minnesota, U.S.
 Willow River (St. Croix River tributary), in St. Croix County, Wisconsin, U.S.
 Willow River (Tomahawk River tributary), in Oneida County, Wisconsin, U.S.

See also
 Big Willow River, a tributary of James Bay in Ontario, Canada
 Little Willow River (Mississippi River tributary), in Aitkin County, Minnesota, U.S.
 Willow River State Park, a state park in St. Croix County, Wisconsin, U.S.